Helicap is a Singapore-based fintech and investment company. It specialises in the private credit market in Southeast Asia.

History 
The company was founded in January 2018 in Singapore by David Z Wang, Quentin Vanoekal and Jeremy Tan. In May 2018, Helicap raised US$1.5 million in a seed funding round led by Teo Ser Luck, the former Minister of State for Manpower. Other investors included Lim How Teck, Samuel Rhee, and Sam Phoen. At the same time, the company started cooperation with Singaporean data company Nufin Data, which is a subsidiary of Jing King Tech. In September, Helicap raised US$5 million in a Pre-Series A round led by East Ventures and Soilbuild Group Holdings.

In August 2019, Helicap acquired securities firm Arcor Capital.

In April 2020, Helicap raised US$10 million in a Series A funding. In October 2021, the company was one of the participants in the debt financing of the Funding Societies platform. In the next month, Helicap was one of the backers pre-series A round of the startup Moduit. 

In January 2022, the company provided $15 million in debt to the startup ErudiFi. In June of the same year, Helicap provided $15 million to the technology social enterprise iCare Benefits. In the same month, Helicap raised US$5 million in a strategic funding round led by Tikehau Capital and PhillipCapital. In September, the company also provided 20 million US dollars to the Philippines startup Billease.

References 

Investment companies of Singapore
Financial services companies established in 2018
2018 establishments in Singapore